Irancode is the Iranian national products and services classification and codification system. It enables producers and distributors to identify, classify, and codify their products and services.  Iran is implementing this bar code system across the country in order to facilitate e-commerce and tax collection.

See also
Ministry of Economic Affairs and Finance (Iran)
Taxation and customs in Iran

References

External links
Official website - Irancode

Economy of Iran
Product classifications